Dark Latin Groove is the debut studio album by American salsa group Dark Latin Groove. The album peaked at #35 on the Top Latin Albums chart and #5 on the Tropical Albums chart. The album received a Grammy nomination for Best Tropical Latin Album.

Track listing

 No Morirá (No Matter What) - 4:31
 Me Va an Extrañar (Unchain My Heart) - 4:41
 Dark Latin Groove - 4:42
 Si Tú No Estás - 4:44
 Muévete - 4:36
 Todo Mi Corazón - 4:59
 Triste y Solo (Broken Hearted) - 4:58
 Suéltame - 4:20

References

External links

1996 debut albums
Dark Latin Groove albums
Albums produced by Sergio George
Sony Discos albums